Robert Kišerlovski (born 9 August 1986) is a Croatian former professional road bicycle racer, who competed professionally between 2005 and 2018 for the , , , , , ,  and  squads.

Career
At the 2011 Paris–Nice, Kišerlovski crashed on a slippery downhill and slid underneath a parked truck, being caught underneath it for several minutes and needing eight stitches.

On Stage 14 of the 2012 Tour de France Kišerlovski came off the worst when the road was sabotaged with tacks. Kišerlovski crashed, breaking his collarbone, and was left having to abandon the race. The injury forced him to miss the Summer Olympics in London.

Kišerlovski left  at the end of the 2012 season, and joined  on a two-year contract from the 2013 season onwards. In September 2014 it was announced that he would be joining  at the start of 2015 on a two-year contract with a view to riding as a domestique for riders such as Alberto Contador.

He is the brother of fellow racing cyclist Emanuel Kišerlovski.

Major results

2005
 8th Overall Tour of Slovenia
2006
 2nd GP Kranj
 4th Overall Tour of Slovenia
2007
 1st Gran Premio Palio del Recioto
2008
 3rd Overall Tour of Slovenia
 5th Overall Istrian Spring Trophy
 6th Trofeo Zsšdi
 8th Overall Settimana Ciclistica Lombarda
2009
 4th Overall Settimana internazionale di Coppi e Bartali
 10th Gran Premio Nobili Rubinetterie
2010
 1st Giro dell'Appennino
 10th Overall Giro d'Italia
1st Stage 4 (TTT)
2011
 6th Overall Giro del Trentino
 7th Overall Giro di Sardegna
 7th Classica Sarda
2012
 3rd Road race, National Road Championships
 5th La Flèche Wallonne
 7th Overall Volta a Catalunya
 9th Overall Paris–Nice
 9th Grand Prix of Aargau Canton
2013
 1st  Road race, National Road Championships
2014
 7th Overall Tirreno–Adriatico
 10th Overall Volta a Catalunya
 10th Overall Giro d'Italia
2018
 4th Overall Tour de Yorkshire

Grand Tour general classification results timeline

References

External links

Profile on team website

Living people
1986 births
Croatian male cyclists
Sportspeople from Čačak
Croats of Serbia